In mathematics, especially in the area of algebra known as group theory, the Prüfer rank of a pro-p group measures the size of a group in terms of the ranks of its elementary abelian sections. The rank is well behaved and helps to define analytic pro-p-groups.  The term is named after Heinz Prüfer.

Definition 

The Prüfer rank of pro-p-group  is 

where  is the rank of the abelian group 

, 

Properties 
Those profinite groups with finite Prüfer rank are more amenable to analysis.

Specifically in the case of finitely generated pro-p groups, having finite Prüfer rank is equivalent to having an open normal subgroup that is powerful.  In turn these are precisely the class of pro-p groups that are p-adic analytic - that is groups that can be imbued with a 
p-adic manifold structure.

References 

Infinite group theory